Tinaroo gibbicollis is a beetle in the Staphylinidae family, which is found in Victoria.

It was first described by Arthur Mills Lea in 1911 as Batrisodes gibbicollis from a male specimen collected in Victoria, (in Wandin).

Description
Lea describes the species:

References 

Pselaphinae
Beetles described in 1911
Taxa named by Arthur Mills Lea